The Burkholderiales-2 RNA motif is a conserved RNA structure that was discovered by bioinformatics.
Burkholderiales-2 motifs are found in Betaproteobacteria. Although one example is predicted in the phyum Bacteroidota, this is likely to be the result of a recent horizontal gene transfer or sequence contamination.

Burkholderiales-2 RNAs likely function in trans as sRNAs.  There is weak evidence of an association with S24 peptidases.

References

Non-coding RNA